Dan Miron (born 1934) is an Israeli-born American literary critic and author.

An expert on modern Hebrew and Yiddish literature, Miron is a Professor emeritus at the Hebrew University of Jerusalem. He is currently the Leonard Kaye Professor of Hebrew and Department of Middle Eastern, South Asian, and African Studies (MESAAS) at Columbia University.

Since the 1950s Professor Miron published dozens of books and hundreds of articles on different modern Hebrew and also Yiddish writers, including Hayim Nahman Bialik, Nathan Alterman, Uri Zvi Greenberg and Sholem Aleichem.

In 2012, Miron co-founded Afik Publishing House of Israeli Literature with Iftach Alony.

Published works

From Continuity to Contiguity: Toward a New Jewish Literary Thinking (2010)
The Image of the Shtetl, Syracuse UP (2000)
A Traveler Disguised: The Rise of Modern Yiddish Fiction in the Nineteenth Century  (1973)
From the Worm a Butterfly Emerges

Awards and critical acclaim

 In 1980, Miron was awarded the Bialik Prize for Jewish thought.
 In 1998, he was awarded the Itzik Manger Prize for contributions to Yiddish letters.
 In 1993, he received the Israel Prize for Hebrew literature.
In 2010, he won a National Jewish Book Award in the Scholarship category for From Continuity to Contiguity

The Jewish Daily Forward called Miron "the doyen of Israeli literary criticism."

Bibliography 
 Haim Hazaz : a Monograph. Hapoalim Publishers, 1959
  Sholem Aleichem – an essay . Masada Publishers, 1970 (An enlarged edition published in 1976)
  Sholem Aleichem: person, persona, presence (English). YIVO Institute, 1972
 A Traveler Disguised: The Rise of Modern Yiddish Fiction in the Nineteenth Century (Judaic Traditions in Literature, Music, and Art (English). Schocken Books, 1973
 Four Faces in Contemporary Hebrew Literature: Studies in The Works of Alterman, Ratosh, Yizhar and Shamir, Schocken Publishers, 1975
 Between Truth and Vision – the Beginnings of the Hebrew and Yiddish novel in the Nineteenth Century. Mosad Bialik, 1979
 Open Notebook; Discussions of Current Israeli Fiction, Hapoalim Publishers, 1979
  Lights' Adjuatment – 20th Century Hebrew Fiction. Schocken Books, 1979
  Der Imazh fun Shtetl – the fictional world of the Jewish Shtetl in the works of Sh. Y Abramovitsh and Sholem Aleichem, I. L. Peretz. Hakibbutz Hameuchad Publishing House, 1981
Taking Leave of The Impoverished Self: Ch. N. Bialki's Early Poetry, 1891–1901. The Open University Press, 1986.
Founding Fathers, Stepsisters: The Advent of Hebrew Women's Poetry & Other Essays. Hakibbutz Hameuchad Publishing House, 1987
 If There is No Jerusalem – Essays on Israeli literature and Society. Hakibbutz Hameuchad Publishing House, 1987
 Come, Night – Irrationalism in early 20th Century Hebrew Literature. Dvir Publishing House, 1987
 When Loners Come Together – a Generational Portrait of Hebrew Literature at the Beginning of the Twentieth Century. Am Oved Publishing, 1987
  Ashkenaz: Modern Hebrew Literature and the Premodern German Jewish Experience  (English) . Leo Beck Institute, 1989
 Founding Mothers, Stepsisters – How Hebrew Women's Poerty started. Hakibbutz Hameuchad Publishing House, 1994 (An enlarged edition published in 2004)
 Involved: Essays on Literature, Culture, and Society. Zamora Publishing, 1994
 Facing the Silent Brother – The Poetry of the 1948 War. Keter Publishing House, 1992
 News from the Arctic Zone – Studies in modern Hebrew Poetry. Zamora Publishing, 1993
 The Imaginary Physician: Classical Hebrew and Yiddish literature. Hakibbutz Hameuchad Publishing House, 1995
 An Estranged Classic –a Study of S.Y.Agnon's 'The Bridal Canopy' . Hakibbutz Hameuchad Publishing House, 1996
 Posterity Hooked : U.N.Gnessin's Stories Interpreted. Mosad Bialik, 1997
  "Man is Nothing But…" – the Weakness of Power, the Power of the Weak: a Study in the Poetry of Power. Zamora Publishing, 1999
 Snow of the Dove's Wing – The poetry of Abraham Sutskever. Keshev leshira Publishing, 1999
 The Image of the Shtetl and other Studies of Modern Jewish Imagination (English). Syracuse University Press, 2000
  H.N.Bialik and the Prophetic Mode in modern Hebrew Poetry  (English). Syracuse University Press, 2000
 From the Worm – A Butterfly; Young Nathan Alterman, a monograph. The Open University, 2001
 The Fragile Power – a Study if Yehudit Hendel's Fiction. Hakibbutz Hameuchad Publishing House, 2002
 Akdamut – Introducing Uri Zvi Greenberg. Mosad Bialik, 2002
 The Dark Side of Sholem Aleichem's Laughter. Am Oved Publishing, 2004
 In the City of Slaughter – a belated Visit. Resling Publishing, 2005 (Together with Hannan Hever and Michael Gluzman)
  Relax, then Touch – A new view of Jewish literary interrelationships . Am Oved Publishing, 2005
  The Blind Library – Mixed Prose 1980–2005. Yediot Books; Sifre Ḥemed, 2005
  The Shock of Independence: Reverberations in Early Israeli Poetry  (English). Hunter College Press, 2006
  On the Poverty of Literairiness – a Study of Sholem Aleichem . Hakibbutz Hameuchad Publishing House, 2007
  The Prophetic Mode in Modern Hebrew Poetry and Other Essays on Modern Hebrew Literature  (English). Toby Press, New Milford, Conn.  2010
 From Continuity to Contiguity : Toward a New Jewish Literary Thinking (English). Stanford University press, 2010
 Half Past Nine – on the Fiction of A.B. Yehoshua. Hakibbutz Hameuchad Publishing House, 2011
 The Focalizing Chrystal – on the Poetry and Prose Fiction of Vladimir Jabotinsky. Mosad Bialik, 2011
 From Mouth to Ear – Sholem Aleichem's Art of the Monologue . Afik Books, 2012
 More!: Cognitive Patterns in Early Israeli Poetry. Afik Books, 2013
 Why Gnessin? New Studies of a Hebrew Master. Mosad Bialik, 2014
 The Animal in the Synagogue – Aspects of Kafka's Jewishness. Afik Books, 2016
 From Experience to Ritual – the Crisis of Hebrew Modernism in the 1930's: the Case of Tessler. Mosad Bialik, 2016
  Burning Sparks – on the Poetry of Leah Ayalon. Even Hoshen Private Press, 2017
 The Orphic Voice, Vols I-II, Israeli Women's Poetry. Afik Books, 2017
 The Stars Vindicated : Nathan Alterman's "Stars Outside" Re-Viewed. Am Oved Publishing, 2019 (Together with Ariel Hirschfeld)
 Approximations : Studies of Israeli Poetry. Afik Books, 2021
 Between Two Mountains. Literary Pairs – Proximity, Distance & Creative Friction. Bar-Ilan University Press, 2021

References

External links
 Amos Goren, "Kingdom of Jews" , in Eretz Acheret magazine, an article about Dan Miron's Hebrew translation of Jacob Glatstein's Ven Yash iz gekumen ("When Yash Arrived")

1934 births
Israeli Ashkenazi Jews
Academic staff of the Hebrew University of Jerusalem
Israel Prize in literature recipients
Living people
Columbia University faculty
Israeli literary critics
Itzik Manger Prize recipients